The Paso Robles Carnegie Library is a Carnegie library located in Paso Robles City Park in Paso Robles, California. The library was built from 1907 to 1908 through a $10,000 grant from the Carnegie Foundation. Architect William H. Weeks, who designed several other buildings in the city, designed the library in the Classical Revival style. The projecting front entrance of the building has an ornamented pediment supported by two columns and two wide brick pilasters. The building has a decorative cornice, and an ornamental frieze is located beneath the pediment and cornice at the entrance. The Works Progress Administration expanded the back of the library in 1939. The library operated until 1995, when it was replaced by a new building and purchased by the city's historical society.

The library was added to the National Register of Historic Places on January 26, 1998.

References

External links

Carnegie libraries in California
Library buildings completed in 1908
Buildings and structures in Paso Robles, California
Libraries on the National Register of Historic Places in California
Neoclassical architecture in California
National Register of Historic Places in San Luis Obispo County, California
1908 establishments in California
W. H. Weeks buildings